Every Which Way but Loose is a 1978 American action comedy film released by Warner Bros., produced by Robert Daley and directed by James Fargo.  It stars Clint Eastwood in an uncharacteristic and offbeat comedy role as Philo Beddoe, a trucker and bare-knuckle brawler roaming the American West in search of a lost love while accompanied by his brother/manager, Orville, and his pet orangutan, Clyde. In the process, Philo manages to cross a motley assortment of characters, including a pair of police officers and an entire motorcycle gang (the Black Widows of Pacoima), who end up pursuing him for revenge.

Eastwood's appearance in the film, after his string of Spaghetti Western and Dirty Harry roles, somewhat startled the film industry and he was reportedly advised against making it. Although it was poorly reviewed by critics, the film went on to become an enormous success and became, along with its 1980 sequel Any Which Way You Can, two of the highest grossing Eastwood films. When adjusted for inflation, it ranks as one of the top 250 highest-grossing films of all time.

Plot
Philo Beddoe is a truck driver living in the San Fernando Valley. He lives in a small house, with an orangutan named Clyde, behind that of his brother, Orville Boggs, and his mother. Philo makes money on the side as a bare-knuckle fighter; he is often compared to a legendary fighter named Tank Murdock.

One night Philo becomes smitten with Lynn Halsey-Taylor, an aspiring country music singer he meets at the Palomino Club, a local honky-tonk. His relationship with her seems to be going well until one day she and her camper disappear from the trailer park. Believing that he is falling for her, Philo decides to set off for Lynn's home in Denver, Colorado.

Along the way, he has a run-in with a motorcycle gang called the Black Widows, who incur Philo's wrath after two gang members insult him and Clyde at a traffic light. Philo chases them down and takes their bikes (which he repaints, repairs, and resells), and every attempt they make to get even results in disaster. Philo also incurs the wrath of an LAPD cop named Putnam, with whom he gets into a fight at the Palomino. Both the officer and the Widows learn of Philo's trip to Colorado and head off to find him, incurring wrath along the way.

Sans any wrath incurred, Orville and Clyde accompany Philo to Denver, and on the way, they meet a woman named Echo who becomes Orville's girlfriend. They earn money along the way by booking fights for Philo. After a fight in a slaughterhouse, the man holding the money tries to stiff Philo. This incurs the wrath of Echo, who fires two shots from a .38, dead center into a side of beef (the wrath incurred by the side of beef was accidental). She lets the crowd know she knows how to shoot, saying, "The second shot was to let you know the first was no accident." The man hands over the money.

Knowing that Philo has come to look for her, Lynn helps the Black Widows lure him into a trap. Philo sees Lynn and attempts to talk to her, but finds himself surrounded by the Black Widows. He manages to fight most of them until Orville intervenes. Using a garbage truck with a dumpster hoist, he dumps all the motorcycles into the back of the truck. The Widows charge the garbage truck, but Orville gets away. Philo, Echo, and Orville then escape.

Philo finally finds Lynn and she reveals her true nature to him. Hurt by her callousness, Philo says that he is the only one dumb enough to want to take her further than her bed. Philo having now incurred wrath himself for the first time, he watches as Lynn erupts in a fit of rage, striking him repeatedly until she collapses in tears.

Orville learns that Tank Murdock, based in the area, is ready to retire after one more fight. Orville makes the arrangements, and Philo faces his elderly nemesis. During the fight, the crowd, initially pro-Murdock, begins to insult him, with some murmurs that Philo is going to be the next Murdock. Philo lets his guard down, intentionally giving Murdock a clear shot, knocking Philo down for the count. Murdock, having regained the crowd's esteem, is allowed to retire undefeated, although he knows Philo let him win. Clyde, Orville and Echo head home the next day, free and clear of any and all wrath.

Cast 

 Clint Eastwood as Philo Beddoe
 Sondra Locke as Lynn Halsey-Taylor
 Geoffrey Lewis as Orville
 Beverly D'Angelo as Echo
 Ruth Gordon as Ma
 Walter Barnes as Tank Murdock
 George Chandler as D.M.V. Clerk
 Sam Gilman as Fat Man's Friend
 Roy Jenson as Woody, Secretary Biker
 James McEachin as Herb
 Bill McKinney as Dallas, Treasurer Biker 
 William O'Connell as Elmo, Sergeant-at-Arms Biker
 John Quade as Cholla, the Biker Leader 
 Dan Vadis as Frank, Assistant Head Biker
 Gregory Walcott as Putnam
 Hank Worden as Trailer Court Manager

Screenwriter Jeremy Kronsberg has a small role as Bruno the biker, while martial artist Gene LeBell also features as another Biker. Orangutan Manis co-stars as the ape, Clyde. Making uncredited appearances are Harry Guardino as James Beekman, Mel Tillis as emcee/performer at the Palomino honky tonk club, and Phil Everly as singer at the Palomino honky tonk club.

Production
The script, written by Jeremy Joe Kronsberg, had been turned down by many other big production companies in Hollywood. Eastwood unexpectedly took a liking to the project himself, seeing it as a way to broaden his appeal to the public. Most of Eastwood's production team and his agents reportedly thought it was ill-advised. Bob Hoyt, whom Eastwood had contacts with (through his Malpaso secretary Judy Hoyt and Eastwood's long-term friend Fritz Manes), thought it showed promise and eventually convinced Warner Brothers to buy it. An orangutan named Manis was brought in to play Clyde; also cast were Geoffrey Lewis as the dimwitted Orville, Beverly D'Angelo as his girlfriend, and Sondra Locke as Lynn Halsey-Taylor, the country and western barroom singer. Eastwood spoke about using the orangutan for the main role, "Clyde was one of the most natural actors I ever worked with! But you had to get him on the first take because his boredom level was very limited."

The film has a contemporary western theme, displaying the blue collar aspects of the western United States, with many scenes shot in rural locations, cheap motel rooms, industrial facilities, and honky-tonk bars. The film was shot on location, including the California communities of Bakersfield, North Hollywood, San Fernando, Sun Valley, Ukiah, and Van Nuys. It was also filmed in Colorado, including parts of Denver, Aurora and historic Georgetown. A few scenes were also filmed in Albuquerque, Santa Fe and Taos, all in New Mexico.

The 34-year-old Locke "reluctantly" got an abortion late in the shoot. This was three years into her cohabitation with Eastwood.

Title origin
The film's title refers to the Eddie Rabbitt song of the same name from the soundtrack, in which the singer complains that his girlfriend turns him "every which way but loose"; i.e., he cannot bring himself to leave her although he is more of a freewheeling character.

Reception

Box office performance
Upon its release, the film was a surprising success and became Eastwood's most commercially successful film at the time. The film opened in 1,275 theatres and grossed $10,272,294 in its first week, beating Eastwood's previous best opener, The Enforcer.

It grossed a total of $104.3 million in the United States and Canada, ranking high amongst those of Eastwood's career, and was the second-highest-grossing film of 1978.

Critical response
It received largely negative reviews, however. Janet Maslin of The New York Times called the film "the slackest and most harebrained of Mr. Eastwood's recent movies. It's overlong and virtually uneventful, even though there are half a dozen cute characters and woolly subplots competing for the viewer's attentions." Variety commented, "This film is so awful it's almost as if Eastwood is using it to find out how far he can go—how bad a film he can associate himself with." Gene Siskel of the Chicago Tribune awarded 2.5 stars out of 4 and wrote that the comedy "breaks new ground" for Eastwood, but the film "has been sloppily made. Its villains are pathetic cartoon characters; its seemingly-sweet leading lady turns out to be a psychotic. These errors cripple what could have been an extremely entertaining story." Charles Champlin of the Los Angeles Times called it "a slapdash, slapstick comedy" that "pushes all the right buttons" for audiences but "lacks both the urgency and the emotional satisfactions of Eastwood's angrier films." Gary Arnold of The Washington Post wrote, "Eastwood must have thought of his blundering new vehicle, 'Every Which Way but Loose,' as a change of pace, designed to align his career in a direction similar to that of Burt Reynolds. Casual, knockabout farce seems to be the general idea, but perhaps Eastwood should have borrowed the director and writers who helped shape 'Smokey and the Bandit' and 'Hooper' for Reynolds. 'Every Which Way but Loose' certainly isn't loose. It's a sluggish shambles." David Ansen of Newsweek wrote, "One can forgive the orangutan's participation - he couldn't read the script - but what is Eastwood's excuse? That a star with his power in Hollywood would choose to litter the screen with this plotless junk heap of moronic gags, sour romance and fatuous fisticuffs can be taken either as an expression of contempt for his huge audience or as an act of masochism."

As of October 2021, it holds a rating of 39% on Rotten Tomatoes based on 28 reviews. The website's critical consensus reads, "The inexplicable pairing of Clint Eastwood with an orangutan is the least of Every Which Way But Looses problems – a slack action-comedy with a haphazardly assembled story."

Soundtrack
The soundtrack album included many successful country music hits, two new songs of which reached No. 1 on the Billboard Hot Country Singles chart in 1979: the title track "Every Which Way but Loose" by Eddie Rabbitt and "Coca-Cola Cowboy" by Mel Tillis; also included was "Behind Closed Doors" by Charlie Rich, which had reached the No. 1 spot on the Hot Country Singles chart in 1973. Both Rich and Tillis had other songs reach the top 5 of the country chart: Rich's "I'll Wake You Up When I Get Home" (No. 3) and Tillis' "Send Me Down to Tucson" (No. 2).

Producer Snuff Garrett was hired to produce songs for the film, including three for Sondra Locke's character, something which proved problematic as Locke was not a professional singer. Locke, who appears as Eastwood's love interest, performs several musical numbers in the film as well.

In addition to "Behind Closed Doors", a 1960 song by Hank Thompson, "A Six Pack to Go" was featured in the film and included on the soundtrack.

Charts

References

Bibliography

External links 
 
 
 
 
 

1978 films
1970s action comedy films
1970s American films
American action comedy films
American boxing films
1970s English-language films
Country music films
Films about apes
Underground fighting films
Films directed by James Fargo
Malpaso Productions films
Films set in the San Fernando Valley
Films shot in Wyoming
Films shot in Colorado
Films shot in New Mexico
1978 comedy films